Dick Walker (10 August 1872 – 3 December 1947) was an Australian rules footballer who played with Geelong and Carlton in the Victorian Football League (VFL).

His real name was Edward Slann Kishere, but he played football under the name Dick Walker. 

Kishere died in a Geelong hospital on 3 December 1947.

Notes

External links 
		

Dick Walker's profile at Blueseum

1872 births
1947 deaths
Australian rules footballers from Victoria (Australia)
Australian Rules footballers: place kick exponents
Geelong Football Club (VFA) players
Geelong Football Club players
Carlton Football Club players